Bart Claes  (born 8 April 1989) is a Belgian politician who has been a member of the Flemish parliament for the Flemish nationalist Vlaams Belang party since 2019.

Biography 
Claes studied law at the University of Antwerp and the University of Ghent. During his studies he was a member of the Nationalistische Studentenvereniging and the New Flemish Alliance party. In 2014 he left the N-VA due to disagreeing with the course of the party and joined Vlaams Belang. After graduating, Claes worked for Katoen Natie.

From 2016 to 2020, Claes was chairman of the Vlaams Belang Jongeren. In 2019, Claes was elected as a member of the Flemish Parliament for the Antwerp region. During the 2019 Belgian federal election, Claes managed the VB's election campaign and claimed that he looked to both the Brexit and Donald Trump presidential campaigns as examples of how to target voters.

References 

Living people
1989 births
Vlaams Belang politicians
Members of the Flemish Parliament
New Flemish Alliance politicians
University of Antwerp alumni
Ghent University alumni
Politicians from Mechelen